Simplemente... Lalo (Simply... Lalo) is a studio album by Lalo Rodríguez released in 1980. This album marked Rodriguez's debut as a solo artist.

Track listing

References

1980 debut albums
Lalo Rodríguez albums